Tuluva Narasa Nayaka was the founder of the Tuluva dynasty of the Vijayanagara Empire. He was the father of Emperor Krishnadevaraya.

Biography 
Tuluva Narasa Nayaka, like his father Tuluva Ishvara Nayaka, was a commander in the Vijayanagara Empire. After the death of king Saluva Narasimha in 1491, crown prince Thimma Bhupala was murdered by an army commander. The faithful Narasa Nayaka then crowned the other prince, Narasimha Raya II but retained all administrative powers in order to bring stability to the kingdom. He was called the rakshakarta (protector) and svami (Lord). He held the offices of the senadhipati (commander-in-chief), the mahapradhana (Prime Minister) and the karyakarta (agent) of the king. He successfully kept the Bahamani Sultans and the Gajapatis away from the kingdom and quelled many rebellions by unfaithful chieftains, trying to exert their independence.

Capturing Narasimha Raya II in fortress of Penukonda 
After the death of king Saluva Narasimha in 1491, crown prince Thimma Bhupala was murdered by an army commander. The faithful Narasa Nayaka then crowned the other prince, Narasimha Raya II but retained all administrative powers in order to bring stability to the kingdom. Narasimha Raya II was a teenager when he became Emperor of the Vijayanagara Empire, and real power lay in the hands of his guardian, Tuluva Narasa Nayaka. In 1494,Narsa Captured Narasimha II in Fortress of Penukonda.Narsa ruled Vijayanagar in disguise of Narasimha raya II.

Narsa Nayak's victory over south

Hoysala campaign 
During August 1463, when Vijayanagar was ruled by Saluva Narasimha Deva Raya, the region south of Kaveri river had slipped out of Vijayanagar Empire control when the king was busy protecting interests closer to the capital. In 1496, Narasa Nayaka marched south and brought under control rebellious chiefs like the governor of Trichi named Salas Rai and Tanjore named Vikram Shah. The whole area south of Kaveri to Cape Comorin was brought under control. The chiefs of Chola, Chera, Madurai area, Heuna or Hoysala chief of Srirangapatna and Gokarna on the west coast were brought under Vijayanagar empire control in one long successful campaign which ended in May 1497.

Resistance to Gajapati Prataparudra Deva 
In 27 November 1496, Gajapati king Prataparudra attacked Vijayanagar and advanced up to Pennar but Narasa Nayaka held out and succeeded in a stalemate.

Victory of Bahmani Kingdom 
Narasa Nayaka wasted little time in stabilizing the kingdom. The Bahamani Kingdom by now was breaking up into smaller independent chiefdoms. Qasim Barid, a Bahamani minister offered Narasa Nayaka the forts of Raichur and Mudgal in return for help in defeating Yusuf Adil Khan of Bijapur. According to writings by Ferishta, Narasa Nayaka sent an army to the Raichur doab area that devastated the area in the doab. Yusuf Adil lost this part of the doab and repeated attempts to recover it failed. Having failed to defeat him in battle, Yusuf Adil Khan invited Narasa Nayaka to Bijapur on a peace offering and had Narasa Nayaka and seventy high-ranking officers murdered. However, it was only in 1502 that the wily ruler of Bijapur could recover the doab region for Vijayanagar empire.
Towards the end of his rule, Tuluva Narasa Nayaka had effectively carried on the dream of his king, Saluva Narasimha Deva Raya in protecting the empires interests. He built a robust administration and an effective army. He had regained control over large domains in South India and kept the Bahamani Sultans and the Gajapatis at bay and brought the rebellious chiefs under control, making way for the golden era of Vijayanagara under his talented and able son Krishnadevaraya.
He was succeeded by his eldest son
Viranarasimha Raya in 1503.

Notes

References
 Dr. Suryanath U. Kamat, Concise History of Karnataka, 2001, MCC, Bangalore (Reprinted 2002)
 Prof K.A. Nilakanta Sastry, History of South India, From Prehistoric times to fall of Vijayanagar, 1955, OUP, New Delhi (Reprinted 2002)

1503 deaths
Vijayanagara Empire
History of Karnataka
Year of birth unknown
16th-century Indian monarchs